Virág is a Hungarian surname and feminine given name, meaning ’flower’ in Hungarian.

Notable people with the name include:

Surname 
 Bálint Virág (born 1973), Hungarian mathematician
 Béla Virág (born 1976), Hungarian footballer

Given name 
 Virág Csurgó (born 1972), Hungarian tennis player
 Virág Németh (born 1985), Hungarian tennis player
 Virág Vaszari (born 1986), Hungarian handball player

In fiction 
 Lipóti Virag, Leopold Bloom's grandfather in James Joyce's Ulysses.

References 

Hungarian feminine given names
Hungarian-language surnames